Red Bells II (also known as 10 Days That Shook the World and Red Bells Part II – I Saw the Birth of the New World; released in the Philippines as Comrade in Arms) is a 1983 adventure-drama film directed by Sergei Bondarchuk. It was coproduced by Soviet Union (where it was released as Krasnye kolokola, film vtoroy – Ya videl rozhdenie novogo mira and Krasnye kolokola II), Italy (where is known as I dieci giorni che sconvolsero il mondo) and Mexico (where its title is Campanas rojas II – Rusia 1917). It is the last of a two-part film centered on the life and career of John Reed, the revolutionary communist journalist that had already inspired Warren Beatty's Reds. This chapter focuses on Reed's book Ten Days That Shook the World.

Cast
Franco Nero as John Reed
Sydne Rome as Louise Bryant
Olegar Fedoro as Colonel Polkovnikov 
Anatoli Ustyzhaninov as Vladimir Lenin
Bohdan Stupka as Alexander Kerensky
Valery Barinov as Nikolai Podvoisky

Release
Red Bells II was released in the Soviet Union in 1983. In the Philippines, the film was released as Comrade in Arms by Movierama International on July 29, 1988.

See also
Red Bells

References

External links

1983 films
1983 multilingual films
1983 drama films
Films about journalists
Films directed by Sergei Bondarchuk
Films scored by Georgy Sviridov
Films set in 1917
Italian multilingual films
Mexican drama films
Mexican multilingual films
Soviet multilingual films
1980s Russian-language films
English-language Soviet films
English-language Italian films
English-language Mexican films
Russian Revolution films
Cultural depictions of Vladimir Lenin
1980s Mexican films